This is a complete list of ice hockey players who were drafted in the National Hockey League Entry Draft by the Quebec Nordiques franchise. It includes every player who was drafted, regardless of whether they played for the team.

Key
 Played at least one game with the Nordiques
 Spent entire NHL career with the Nordiques
() Inducted into the Hockey Hall of Fame
() Number retired by the Nordiques

Draft picks

WHA
Statistics show each player's career regular season totals in the WHA.

NHL

See also
List of Quebec Nordiques players
1979 NHL Expansion Draft
List of Colorado Avalanche draft picks

References

 
 
 
 
 

 
 
draft
Quebec Nordiques